The Fantasies of Robert A. Heinlein is a collection of science fantasy short stories by American  writer Robert A. Heinlein.

The contents of the book are exactly two previous collections of Heinlein's short stories: Waldo & Magic, Inc. (1950) and The Unpleasant Profession of Jonathan Hoag (1959), here arranged chronologically in order of publication:

 "Magic, Inc." (1940)
 ""—And He Built a Crooked House—"" (1941)
 "They" (1941)
 "Waldo" (1942)
 "The Unpleasant Profession of Jonathan Hoag" (1942)
 "Our Fair City" (1948)
 "The Man Who Traveled in Elephants" (1957)
 "All You Zombies—" (1959)

The hardcover version has 320 pages and was published by Tor Books on November 15, 1999. The paperback version (from the same publisher) has 352 pages and was published on May 17, 2002.

External links 
 

1999 short story collections
Short story collections by Robert A. Heinlein
Tor Books books